Mahalaxmi is a municipality that lies in the north-eastern part of the Lalitpur district of Nepal. As per the declaration by the government of Nepal in 2015, it was created through the merger of the Village development committees Imadol, Lubhu, Tikathali, Siddhipur and Lamatar. The city derives its name from the Mahalaxmi-Mahabhairav Temple in Lubhu. The city's total area is 26.5 square kilometres. The municipality has a total number of 10 wards. The old VDC offices are used as joint ward office now .

Name
Mahalaxmi means Great Lakhsmi (Hindu Goddess) in Sanskrit but with a Nepalized Translation as Nepal is the largest Hindu country by percentage of population adherence in the World. According to the 2011 census, the Hindu population in Nepal is estimated to be around 21,551,492, which accounts for at least 81.34% of the country's population out of 28,095,714. Hinduism  arrive in Nepal somewhere in the c. 250 CE but vehemently extended to all of Nepal with Shankara and Prithvi's effort.

Demographics
At the time of the 2011 Nepal census, Mahalaxmi Municipality had a population of 62,624. Of these, 58.5% spoke Nepali, 26.6% Newar, 6.5% Tamang, 2.1% Maithili, 1.4% Magar, 1.0% Rai, 0.8% Tharu, 0.6% Bhojpuri, 0.4% Limbu and 2.1% other languages as their first language.

In terms of ethnicity/caste, 31.0% were Newar, 28.7% Chhetri, 13.5% Hill Brahmin, 7.9% Tamang, 4.7% Magar, 2.4% Rai, 1.5% Tharu, 1.4% Kami, 0.9% Sarki and 8.0% others.

In terms of religion, 85.6% were Hindu, 8.3% Buddhist, 4.1% Christian, 1.1% Kirati, 0.7% Muslim, 0.1% Prakriti and 0.1% others.

Education
There is many reputed education institutions in this metropolis . 
 Mahalaxmi secondary school, Lubhu
Genius IB World School, Lubhu
 United School,Imadol
 Shuvatara School, Lamatar
 Nepal Don Bosco School, Siddhipur
 Pawan Prakriti H.S, Imadol
 Children Garden School, Imadol
 Anant English School, Siddhipur
 Lalit Academy, Siddhipur
 Kopila English School, Siddhipur
 Mount Olive English Secondary School, Siddhipur
 Siddhimangal Higher Secondary School, Siddhipur
 Bhanodaya Primary School, Siddhipur
 High View School, Tikathali
 Balkunja Secondary School, Changathali
 West Wing School, Lubhu
 Aster Academy, Imadol
 NavaKunja School, Siddhipur
 Mahendra Adarsha Higher Secondary School, Imadol
 Xenium ES
 Peace point secondary school
 Machhapuchhre School, Kusunti
 Kantipur International College Of Engineering, Lubhu
 Bloom Nepal School

Hospital/Public Health Post/Primary Health Post
 Kist Medical College & Hospital, Imadol
 Lubhu Public Health Center, Lubhu
 Siddhipur Community Health Care Center, Siddhipur
 Care & Cure Hospital, Siddhipur.

Social Organization
There are many business or social organizations in Siddhipur

Business Organization/Co-operative Organization/Financial Institutions/Other Institutions
 Kist Medical College & Hospital
 Siddhipur (Thasi) Multipurpose Co-operative Ltd.
 Satya Saving and Credit Co-operative Ltd.
 Sahara Saving and Credit Co-operative Ltd.
 Chandani Saving and Credit Co-operative Ltd.
 Asterix Solution Pvt. Ltd.
 Swavalamban Multipurpose Cooperative Ltd Siddhipur

References

External links 
Google map

Municipalities in Lalitpur District, Nepal